Racheal Njoroge is a Kenyan IT professional, businesswoman and corporate executive, who is the managing director of the Southern African region of Cummins, based in Johannesburg, South Africa, effective 1 September 2018. In this capacity, she overseas business operations in South Africa, Angola, Botswana, Lesotho, Madagascar, Malawi, Mauritius, Mozambique, Namibia, Swaziland, Zambia and Zimbabwe.

Background and education
Racheal Njoroge was born and raised in Kenya. She holds a Bachelor of Science degree in Management Information Systems, from Winona State University, in Winona, Minnesota, United States, obtained in 2002. Her degree of Master of Business Administration, with focus on Entrepreneurship was awarded by the Miller College of Business, at Ball State University, in Muncie, Indiana, in the United States, in 2006.

Career
For a period of one and one half years, Ms Njoroge worked as an assistant systems administrator for communications at Madison Insurance Kenya Limited, based in Nairobi, Kenya's capital city, until December 2004. She then spent the following eighteen months working as a graduate assistant in the Bureau of Business Research of the University Computing Services of Ball State University, based in Muncie, Indiana, United States, until May 2006.

After graduating with a master's degree in business administration, she was hired by Cummins, in May 2006, first working in their office in Columbus, Indiana, United States, as an IT Intern. After a short stint at the Southern Africa regional office, Njoroge returned to Columbus and worked as a systems analyst for the next three years. She was then promoted to IT Strategy & Planning Leader, working in that capacity until March 2011.

She was then transferred to the Southern African regional office,  in April 2011, working in various roles, ranging from IT Team Leader for Africa, New Entity Execution & Facilities Director, to Director Of Operations.

In September 2018, after twelve consecutive years of employment, at Cummins, she was appointed the managing director and CEO of the Southern African regional office, responsible for twelve Sub-Saharan countries.

See also
 Adema Sangale
 Anne Karanja

References

External links
Website of  the South African Region of Cummins
Racheal Njoroge appointed Cummins Southern Africa Managing Director

Living people
Year of birth missing (living people)
21st-century Kenyan businesswomen
21st-century Kenyan businesspeople
University of Dubuque alumni
Winona State University alumni
Ball State University alumni